DWMA-TV, channel 4, is a regional television station of Philippine television network People's Television Network. Its transmitter is located at Pacol Road, Brgy. San Felipe, Naga, Camarines Sur.

History
1972 - DWMA-TV channel 8 was launched by Kanlaon Broadcasting System.
1975 - KBS was formally re-launched as RPN, the acronym for its franchise name, Radio Philippines Network.
1986 - Following the People Power Revolution on which it was taken over by pro-Corazon Aquino, the station was reopened as People's Television (PTV).
March 26, 1992 - President Cory Aquino signed Republic Act 7306 turning PTV Network into a government corporation known formally as People's Television Network, Inc. (PTNI).
July 16, 2001 - Under the new management appointed by President Gloria Macapagal Arroyo, PTNI adopted the name National Broadcasting Network (NBN) carrying new slogan "One People. One Nation. One Vision." for a new image in line with its new programming thrusts, they continued the new name until the Aquino administration in 2010.
October 6, 2011 - People's Television Network, Inc. (PTNI) became a primary brand and the branding National Broadcasting Network was retired.
2012 - PTV Naga moved its frequency to channel 4.
2019 - PTV 4 Naga started digital test broadcasts on UHF Channel 46.

Digital television

Digital channels

UHF Channel 46 (665.143 MHz)

Area of coverage

Naga City 
 Camarines Sur
 Portion of Camarines Norte

See also
People's Television Network
List of People's Television Network stations and channels
DWGT-TV - the network's flagship station in Manila.
DWRB-AM

References

People's Television Network
People's Television Network stations
Television channels and stations established in 1972
Television stations in Naga, Camarines Sur
Digital television stations in the Philippines